Hero: 108 is an animated television series created by Yang-Ming Tarng for Cartoon Network. It was broadcast on Cartoon Network and the Kabillion On Demand service in the United States, and aired on the Cartoon Network international channels elsewhere. The series is co-produced by MoonScoop Entertainment, Gamania, Hong Ying Animation and Telegael Teoranta for Turner Entertainment Networks International Limited. It premiered on March 1, 2010.

The show was renewed for another season, which began airing on May 7, 2012, on Cartoon Network (Russia and Southeastern Europe), UK, April 30 on Cartoon Network Too, and on Cartoon Network in the United States on June 4, 2012. The series ended its run on July 9, 2012.

Synopsis
Many years ago in the Hidden Kingdom, animals and humans lived in perfect harmony until an evil trickster named HighRoller arrived and fooled the animals into thinking humans were their enemies. Chaos reigned in the Hidden Kingdom until Commander ApeTrully formed a task force called Big Green to reunite the animals and humans while fighting the forces of HighRoller and the Zebra Brothers.

The storyline in a typical episode follows a formula, although the formula varies and several episodes depart from it: Commander ApeTrully goes on a mission to the castle of an animal kingdom to make peace and ask its inhabitants to join Big Green, bringing a gift of gold as a token of goodwill. The animals generally dismiss the gift, and usually capture ApeTrully who calls for help from First Squad. Members of First Squad (usually everyone except Mr. No Hands, who does come along on occasion) deploy by descending through a maze of tubes and landing on turtles fitted with tank treads, and then are launched through a tunnel and out over the water. When they arrive where ApeTrully is being held, a battle or contest ensues, during which special talents or abilities of the animals are revealed, often something based on their nature. After the battle or contest, the animals usually concede to First Squad's skills saying through translation by ApeTrully (unless the animal rulers can talk) that they would be honored to join Big Green. After joining, the animals often are assigned a particular duty at Big Green based on their demonstrated skills, which may help solve a problem introduced in a subplot.

The show is very loosely based on the ancient Chinese novel Water Margin focusing on the exploits of First Squad and Second Squad.

Episodes

Characters

Big Green
Big Green is a peace-making force with goals to restore peace between the humans and animals:

 Commander ApeTrully (voiced by Ian James Corlett) - Commander ApeTrully is the eccentric, well-meaning leader of Big Green. He formed Big Green in hopes of restoring friendship between animals and humans. In most episodes, he would end up captured by the animals he visits when trying to make peace with them with piles of gold. When in danger, he activates the device on his head to call for First Squad. In "Parrot Castle", he is revealed to be the king of the Monkeys in disguise as he was the first to see through HighRoller's lies, but keeps it a secret to preserve Big Green's morale (in his words, he does not want humans to know it was a monkey who led them). In "Shark Castle" and "Crab Castle", he would accompany First Squad to the underwater castles when riding in Sammo the Whale in order to make peace with the aquatic animals that way. His name is a joke referring to the fact that he's an ape, truly. In the Chinese dub, he was named Song Chang and there was no explanation saying he was a monkey. Classified on the official website as Hero 001. The only thing he can do is use his monkey skills and use an almost endless supply of gold seen on every episode. In "The Rise of Lin Chung", it is shown that Commander ApeTrully owns a diamond that is larger than his body.
 Woo the Wise (voiced by Adrian Petriw) - Woo the Wise is a human inventor who was the first person to be convinced to join Big Green. At some points, his robe tends to rise up. He wears a fake mustache to make himself look older. A running gag is that he says that he knows what he is doing, yet he really has no idea what to do in his head, thinking while sobbing "My head is as empty as a balloon!". In a flashback that was seen in "Folk Game Competition II", he was a former classmate of HighRoller. In "Pitched Battle of the Air Force", Woo the Wise invented a special crystal that could assemble animals into one creature, which he did when he tested on four animals allied with Big Green (Elephant King, Peacock Queen, Octopus King, and Scorpion King) and later merged two hens, Snake King, Crocodile King, and Deer King into a Chimeric Dragon to fight High Roller's fake Black Dragon. In "The Bronze Giant", Woo the Wise makes up the blueprints for upgrading Big Green's base into a mobile battle station and works on it with the other members of Big Green. Classified on the official website as Hero 003.

First Squad
Big Green's elite warriors and the series' main characters. Among its members are:

 Lin Chung (voiced by Andrew Francis) - Classified as Hero 006, Lin Chung is known by some as the most accomplished, most skilled warrior in all of Big Green. He possesses the legendary Panther Vision, which allows him to see great distances, or to see the world in slow motion while he moves with speed. He wields a staff that can shoot edible bamboo shoots out at enemies. 
 Jumpy Ghostface (voiced by Brian Drummond) - Classified as Hero 088, Jumpy Ghostface is the King of the Rabbits. He is a talented, straight-ahead fighter who dives headfirst into dangerous battles without flinching an ear. He may look cute as a bunny, but Jumpy is not the sort of animal one would want to meet in combat. 
 Mystique Sonia (voiced by Kelly Sheridan) - Classified as Hero 103, Mystique Sonia is a tough, seasoned warrior. She is usually bickering with Mighty Ray. She can use her long tongue in battle to fight off enemies, using it like a whip and spinning it around to produce winds.
 Yaksha - Due to a spell cast on Mystique Sonia, anyone who declares their love for her three times turns into a Yaksha. Yaksha is a purple-and-pink creature which rests upon Mystique Sonia's head like a hat. It is also an extremely flexible and stretchable being shown to turn into various forms to aid Mystique Sonia like an accessory, a dress, and a trampoline. It can even extend its arms to propel Mystique Sonia forward. 
 Mighty Ray (voiced by Ian James Corlett) - Classified as 025, Mighty Ray is a warrior of First Squad. He can shoot lasers from his removable eyes, but must recharge them by eating bananas. Mighty Ray was once a member of Mr. No Hands' giant foosball team, as seen in "The Eyes of Mighty Ray" Part I.
 Mr. No Hands (voiced by Ian James Corlett) - Classified as Hero 020, Mr. No Hands is the military leader of Big Green's First Squad though he does not go on missions as often as his teammates. He is a strict but kindhearted human who is easily irritated by the strong-willed warriors under his charge. The tassel of his hat is capable of spinning like a helicopter, allowing him to fly. The hat itself can shoot dangerous darts at his enemies. He keeps himself in a stockade because he cannot stop tickling himself if his hands were free, though Woo's attempt to cure No Hands leads him to now use the stockade to keep his hands from hitting anything in punching distance.

Second Squad
The Big Green's secondary warriors. They are jealous of First Squad and constantly at odds with them to prove their worth. Among its members are:

 Alpha Girl Latifah (voiced by Tabitha St. Germain) - The brown-skinned Oni-style leader of Big Green's Second Squad with long black hair and sharp claws who serves as a rival to Mr. No Hands. She wields a spiked club in battle. She is classified as Hero 101.
 Golden Eye Husky (voiced by Brian Drummond) - Golden Eye Husky is the King of the Ligers who became a member of Big Green's Second Squad after joining Big Green. He seems to be a rival to Jumpy Ghostface since they are both animals. He is classified as Hero 093.
 Kowloon (voiced by Ian James Corlett) - A karate warrior. He seems to be a rival to Lin Chung. In Hero 108 online, he wields a staff. Classified as Hero 023. 
 Hurricane Lee (voiced by Scott McNeil) - A large, gray-skinned, powerfully built member of Big Green's Second Squad and brother of Archer Lee. He wields two axes in battle. It might be possible that he has a rivalry with Mystique Sonia. He doesn't speak until "Second to None". He is classified as Hero 022.
 Archer Lee (voiced by Tabitha St. Germain in Season 1) - The blue-skinned, armored archery member of Big Green's Second Squad and brother of Hurricane Lee. It is possible that he might have a rivalry with Mighty Ray. Archer Lee and Golden Eye Husky are the only characters to be created during Hero 108's Chinese debut. He is classified as Hero 009.

Big Green Air Force
A part of Big Green's army that specializes in air battles. They dress in white and use large jet-shaped firecrackers as jets and giant afros inside their hats as air brakes and parachutes. Among the members are:

 Master Chou (voiced by Brian Drummond) - Leader of Big Green's Air Force. He rides on the same plane as Burly. Classified as Hero 086.
 Rosefinch (voiced by Kelly Sheridan) - Female member of Big Green's Air Force. Classified as Hero 104.
 Burly (voiced by Ian James Corlett) - The biggest member of Big Green's Air Force. He usually pulls together the planes for a combined attack which makes his eyes bulge out. Classified as Hero 065.
 Mano - The member of Big Green's Air Force with an eyepatch. Classified as Hero 083.
 Air Force Staff - The generic staff members that serve the Air Force.

Other members
 Red-Face Kwan (voiced by Eric Bauza) - Classified as Hero 005, he is a human that leads the Infantry of Big Green. He is named Red-Face Kwan because a crab is clamped on his bottom enhancing his anger. When the crab is removed, he makes a funny face as seen in "Lion Castle". He is a direct reference to Guan Yu.
 Sailor Brothers (voiced by Brian Drummond) - Three green-skinned brothers who head up Big Green's Navy. They have a habit of collecting string in order to make their fishing nets and are good ring throwers due to them always throwing life preservers to rescue drowning people. They have a major crush on Mystique Sonia. Classified as Heroes 028, 029 and 030. 
 Rattle Diva (voiced by Tabitha St. Germain) - Classified as Hero 073, Rattle Diva is a geisha guitarist with fangs who loves to play for anyone she comes in contact with and hates those who upstage her during her concerts like when Mighty Ray and Mystique Sonia ruined her concert by getting on stage and performing with her in "Pandaffe Castle". She can also turn her kimono into a rocker outlet and play heavy metal songs. She also wears a wig in her geisha appearance, but removes it when she appears in her rocker costume. She plays a pipa.
 Sammo the Whale (voiced by Andrew Francis) - Classified as Hero 044, Sammo is a whale that serves as transportation for Big Green and the Navy when it comes to missions at sea. His cowardice is what had the other whales drive him away causing his tears to flood the land. 
 Wu Sung (voiced by Eric Bauza) - Wu Sung is the Big Green's dentist. He calls himself a dental warrior due to his dentist tools all being in a swordlike holder. He is the twin brother of the Dog King. He is classified as Hero 014.
 Gardener Ching (voiced by Andrew Francis) - Classified as Hero 102, Big Green's gardener. He grows the large Calabash Gourds for the Tank Army's tanks and would often insult anyone in order to get the tears to help grow them as seen in "Chameleon Castle". Gardener Ching appeared in the original Hero: 108 lineup as well where instead of being a gardener, he can shoot laser eyes.
 Origin Man (voiced by Brian Drummond) - Origin Man is a caveman who was found frozen in a block of ice with a Tyrannosaurus by Twin Masters. Classified as Hero 070.
 Lady Green (voiced by Kathleen Barr) - Classified as Hero 102, Lady Green is a female member of Big Green's navy who has never been defeated in battle before.
 Yan Ching (voiced by Vincent Tong) - A small aquatic humanoid whose strength makes up for his size. Classified as Hero 036.
 Bronze Giant - When Twin Masters began to drain all life in Hidden Kingdom, Lin Chung suddenly was able to draw up the Bronze Giant which has the titular hero classification 108. 
 The Tank Army - A part of Big Green's army consisting of metal glove-wearing soldiers that operate large Calabash Tanks. They are led by the Tank Commander (voiced by Andrew Francis) who is classified as Hero 085. They often accompany Commander ApeTrully on some of his missions to defend him in cases of attack.
 Anti-Air Units - A part of Big Green that operates the Anti-Air Cannons in Big Green as seen in "Air Battle". They are led by the Air Defense Captain (voiced by Ian James Corlett). The soldiers resemble the soldiers in the Tank Army with different-colored armor. They also seem to like Lin Chung's bamboo shoots (which Lin Chung did not know that they can also be edible).

Villains
 Twin Masters (voiced by Scott McNeil) - Twin Masters is a two-toned demon who is HighRoller's master and uses him in his overall scheme to plunge the world into chaos. Twin Masters' head resembles a skull with small, glowing yellow pupils. On his right side, he is red and somewhat jagged, resembling lava and fire. On his left side, he is blue and wavy, resembling water and ice. He was once a human prince named Yang Tu who desired total control of Hidden Kingdom. Because of Lin Chung's interference when he traveled back to the past, he is responsible for turning Yang Tu into Twin Masters.
 HighRoller (voiced by Brian Drummond) - A former trainee under Chiung Ming, he was once a court jester who ended up banished from the Eastern Capital for insulting its emperor and wandered into the Hidden Lands. Upon getting struck by lightning, he gained the ability to communicate with animals and tricked them into thinking humans were their enemies. As the new Emperor of the East Citadel, HighRoller gets to do whatever he wants, and what he typically wants to do is attack humans (or get animals to attack humans for him), eat candy, read comic books, and play games. Classified as Hero 000.
 The Zebra Brothers (voiced by Adrian Petriw and Brian Drummond) - Two Zebra twins that serve HighRoller. Sparky Black is a black zebra with grey stripes and Sparky White is a white zebra with black stripes. Whenever the moon is full, they use their ghostly paper lanterns to give themselves strange powers. Classified as Heroes 062 and 063.
 Bearstomp - Bearstomp is the armored King of the Bears who wears a helmet with a cannon on it. He acts as HighRoller's bodyguard. Classified as Hero 052.
 The Soldiers of Darkness - A group of animal-hating humans who want revenge on the animal community. They kidnapped the Parrots from Parrot Castle under the orders of their leader, the Commander of Darkness (voiced by Brian Drummond in Season 1, Scott McNeil in Season 2). According to Parrot King, the Soldiers of Darkness leave skull marks wherever they go. The Commander is classified as Hero 096.
 Cocky Aliens - A race of aliens who can only be defeated by being kicked 100 times (which leads to the invention of the game Shuttlecock) after which they turn into fruit.
 Spotter the Rabbit (voiced by Trevor Devall) - Spotter is a Rabbit who competed against Jumpy Ghostface to be the Rabbit King's successor. 
 Minotaur (voiced by Kwesi Ameyaw) - A Minotaur resided in a labyrinth that contained a gladiator arena as seen in "Gladiators." In battle, the Minotaur can elongate his horns. 
 Bounty Hunters - Two bounty hunters hired by Twin Masters to capture First Squad and to make up for HighRoller's failure. Nain (voiced by Trevor Devall) is a sword-wielding lion-like bounty hunter where the lion head on his chest can extend out in battle. The second one is an unnamed cobra-style Nāga that can extend her tongue and piloted a snake-like train that carries its victims.

Animals
 Turtles - The Turtles ride on tank treads to serve as transportation for First Squad and Second Squad when they were the first animals to join Big Green. They are classified as Hero 075. Some turtles are often seen wearing cannons on their backs. The Turtles come in different sizes from tank size to the size of roller skates. 
 Rabbits - The Rabbits were the first seen by the audience where they capture Commander ApeTrully when he found out that the Rabbits and their king, Jumpy Ghostface, liked candy rather than carrots. They had him wear a carrot costume and jump rope. They use jump ropes for attacks and even have a bad-smelling belch attack. After Lin Chung beat Jumpy in a jump rope-competition, the Rabbits and Jumpy were the first animal species to join Big Green. 
 Bears - The Bears are one of the allies of HighRoller with some of them serving as HighRoller's Infantry. Seeing as the Bears were valuable to HighRoller, he once wagered to give up Bear Castle to Big Green if they won as seen in "Folk Game Competition". The Bears come in many different colors and some of them wear occasional clothing. Bearstomp is the king of the bears. 
 Elephants - The Elephants use their long noses to attack in which they become deflated and must be re-inflated. The Elephant King enjoys blowing party whistles. After Mighty Ray resuscitated him when he collapsed from blowing his whistle so hard, he joined Big Green to provide fresh air conditioning for the base.
 Ligers - The hides of the Ligers are tough enough for attacks to not harm them. They first are shown tricking Commander ApeTrully and the Tank Army and capturing them. 
 Camels - The Camels enjoy drawing and use their stinky spit as a weapon. 
 Parrots - The Parrots occasionally ride on snails and can drop pellet bombs. They are ruled by the Parrot King who was a teacher to animals including Commander ApeTrully when it comes to teaching them human languages. 
 Pandas and Giraffes - The Pandas and Giraffes live together at Pandaffe Castle. The Giraffes would lift the Pandas onto their necks and throw them at enemies like a catapult. Panda King plays a bamboo flute while Giraffe King plays drums. They formed a band with Rattle Diva after they joined Big Green and are known as the Do-Re-Mi Band.
 Eagles - Commander ApeTrully tried many times to get the Eagles to join Big Green. Each defeat transforms them into different animals. Following their first defeat, they became Bald Eagles due to the lack of feathers on their heads. After their second defeat, the Zebra Brothers accidentally stretched out their necks, turning them into Ostriches. Though they were restored to their Bald Eagle forms by the next appearance.
 Baboons - The Baboons have been stealing water from the humans. They're not evil, but HighRoller infected them with fleas that made them evil. They use spinning tops as weapons making fire monsters when the tops burn the wood. The Baboon King was later hired to help out with the laundry upon joining Big Green.
 Fleas - HighRoller and the Zebra Brothers used special fleas to take control of the Baboons and made them evil. These Fleas end up dormant when exposed to water.
 Mosquitoes - HighRoller's discarding of healthy food ended up attracting Mosquitoes when the food ended up rotting in the garbage pile, so he had Chameleon Queen eat them all.
 Chameleons - The Chameleon Queen and her subjects are allies of HighRoller and is known to eat candy more than insects. She ate enough mosquitoes to become a giantess. 
 Peacocks - The Peacock Queen has tail feathers that mesmerized the humans that lived near Peacock Castle. She also wields a fan that enables her to manipulate winds. Peacocks are good at telling time even when it comes to the Peacock Queen's tea time as two of each Peacock can combine to form a clock. 
 Whales - While Sammo the Whale is on the side of Big Green, there are three whales smaller than he is that make up HighRoller's Navy. 
 Dogs - The Dog King was a human who was raised by Dogs and wears a dog pelt. The Dogs specialize in ice attacks. Dog King is also Wu Sung's long-lost twin brother. 
 Goldfish - They are mentioned in "Rhino Castle" by the Zebra Brothers in giving them tribute to HighRoller.
 Rhinos - When HighRoller got trash from the Rhinos as a tribute since the Rhinos don't want to steal, he equipped their horns with stamps to steal by stamping objects (because of the humans' law of stamping property) with the Zebra Brothers overseeing it. The Rhinos have tough skins. 
 Lions - The designs of the Lions are the same as the Ligers, but brown and with different attacks. They can launch out their manes to attack. Unlike their Liger cousins, their skin is not tough at all and completely vulnerable to attacks. 
 Crocodiles - The Crocodile King enjoys sunbathing as the Crocodiles use this to store up enough energy to emit Sun Beams from their mouths. The Crocodiles are also talented at Yo-Yo tricks. 
 Cats - The Cats can throw Chili Powder Firecrackers that hang from their tails and can make people cry. The Cat King outlawed laughter in his kingdom until they watched Jumpy projected Mighty Ray's slapstick act with his jump rope. 
 Cheetahs - The Cheetahs are the ones who invented shuttlecock when kicking around small "Cocky Aliens" 100 times which explained where pineapples come from. The Cheetahs are one of the few animals portrayed with having both a king and a queen. 
 Sharks - The Sharks once captured a boat load of people causing First Squad and Big Green's Navy to save them. The Shark King is an expert surfer. 
 Butterflies - Jumpy Ghostface managed to befriend a butterfly during Parrot King's lesson. The butterflies can combine to form anyone or anything. 
 Snakes - The Snake King (who resembles a Cobra) uses his eyes to capture anyone who sneaks inside his castle and trap them into a hypnotic state. The snakes resembles jack-in-the-boxes since they reside in wind up boxes.
 Octopi - The Octopi can use their ink powers to suck the colors to remove Big Green's color. 
 Egrets and Oxen - The Egret Queen and Ox King united together and have a talent of working together to farm rice and repel Locusts. They run their own diner in the Big Green Base.
 Locusts - The Locusts have been known to attack the rice crops of the Egrets and Oxen. They can combine to form larger Locusts. 
 Crabs - The Crabs were shown burying people in sand as they are good at sculpting things with sand. The Crab King is designed like an excavator.
 Pigs - Under the orders of HighRoller, Sparky Black once led the Pigs into attacking Big Green. They can perform a Pigtail Vibration Attack and a Pig Nose Vacuum Attack. 
 Skunks - Under the orders of HighRoller, Sparky White once led the Skunks into attacking Big Green. Besides wielding nunchuks, they can combine their stenches to form a Stink Monster. 
 Termites - At the time when the Pig and Skunk Armies attacked Big Green, it was overrun by Termites. Jumpy Ghostface would not allow Mighty Ray to use his eyeball energy attacks on them. 
 Tigers - The Tigers reside in the Great Wall Train in the Rocky Desert which is known to go ahead in time. HighRoller used them to capture the humans in order to power the Great Wall Train in order to cure his toothache. 
 Scorpions - In this show, the Scorpions are depicted as larger than humans. Scorpions are known to make paper ornaments. Their tails contain a poison that turns anyone exposed to it upside down. 
 Groundhogs - The Groundhogs are great diggers. They have been robbing the humans of their vegetables. The Groundhog King learned human language when he tunneled under Parrot Castle. 
 Duckbills - The Cheetah King and Queen take Lin Chung's drawing to the Duckbill King the same time when Commander ApeTrully was making peace with them. The Duckbills can combine in the style of a puzzle to flatten their enemies. 
 Deer - The Deer reside near the Magnetic Mountains. The Deer King is obsessive with perfecting the stacking of the cards. The Deer ride flying magnetic contraptions (shaped like magnets) and ding their antlers into the ground to create earthquakes which are charged up by Deer King's hammer. 
 Porcupines - When HighRoller and the Zebra Brothers capture Big Green's Air Force, he used the Porcupines to give First Squad a humiliating defeat at Spikey Mountains. The Porcupines can launch their spikes in battle which they did when they fired First Squad's balloons powered by Golden Eye Husky's flame. 
 Sheep - The Sheep are one of the few animals that have mastered their human language lessons and are great at knitting sweaters from their wool. The Sheep have their wool covered in body oil so their wool will not shrink. 
 Penguins - The Penguins are designed like bowling pins. Penguin King is able to shed his skin, firing his own skeleton into the air. 
 Frogs - The Frogs have been known to make music with their voices. The Frogs can attack with their tongues. The song notes they sing can form anything ranging from boulders, hammers, and a giant hand. 
 Bats - HighRoller had the bats and the hens combine with the bald eagles to attack Big Green. The bats can read brain waves and can perform sonic attacks. Their wing tips are sharp and the bats, while holding their wings rigid, can be thrown like throwing stars. 
 Hens - HighRoller had the hens and bats combine with the bald eagles to attack Big Green. They can shoot eggs as attacks. 
 Black Dragon - A creature that is said to the most dangerous creature in the Hidden Kingdom. 
 Chimeric Dragon - Woo the Wise used his crystal Rubik's Cube-style invention to merge Crocodile King, Deer King, Snake King, and two hens into a composite dragon. Lin Chung made the right combination exposing the fake Black Dragon and defeating it. When the animals are in this form, it has Crocodile King's head, Deer King's antlers, the legs of the two hens, and Snake King's body. 
 Fireflies - The Fireflies are larger than normal. The Fireflies can breathe fire, shoot lasters from their fingers, launch themselves as missiles, and combine their fire attacks to form a fiery tornado. 
 Gorillas - The Gorilla King accompanies the Zebra Brothers into ambushing Mystique Sonia. Gorilla King has a powerful punch. 
 Kangaroos - The Kangaroo King accompanies the Zebra Brothers into ambushing Mystique Sonia. Kangaroo King has a powerful kick.
 Stingrays - The Stingrays have the ability to fly in the air, shoot lightning from the tips of their tail, and use their flat bodies to deflect projectile attacks. 
 Pangolins - The Pangolins are one of the few animals that have mastered the human language. The Pangolins can roll up into gear-style shapes to attack. 
 Lizards - Commander ApeTrully and First Squad enter a forest in order to make peace with the Lizards (who resemble the frill-necked lizards). The Lizards can extend their tongues to attack and even extend their tails. 
 Seagulls - The Seagulls have mastered the human languages by lingering around the fisherman villages. The Seagulls specialize in wind attacks and can use a smokescreen attack. 
 Flying Squirrels - HighRoller unleashes a swarm of Flying Squirrels on a human village. They can drop acorns as if they were bombs. 
 Wasps - The Wasps attacked First Squad as a diversion so that the Zebra Brothers can poison Mystique Sonia with a misinju-coated dart. 
 Barbets - HighRoller enlists the Barbets to help him find the Humbata Trees. 
 Star-Nosed Moles - First Squad and an armored Commander ApeTrully came to a village's aid when their people were being pulled underground. They discover that the Star-Nosed Moles are the culprits. 
 Owls - The Zebra Brothers steal the Owl Amulet from the Owls. Because of this, the Owls end up attacking a human village in retaliation. The Owls can shoot pellets from their mouths and perform sonic attacks. 
 Armadillos - The Armadillo King is an old classmate of Commander ApeTrully. He and his army were enlisted by Commander ApeTrully to cover for the Turtles. 
 Rock Caterpillars - The Rock Caterpillars are giant caterpillars that are larger than humans. They can shoot silk threads from their mouths. 
 Yaks - The Yaks reside in a castle high in the mountains and are considered to be powerful. The Yaks resemble the Oxen, but have longer fur. 
 Hamsters - In this show, the Hamsters are shown to be human-sized. 
 Iguanas - They appeared at the beginning of "The Return of the Pterodactyls" fighting First Squad and Commander ApeTrully, but they retreat. 
 Vultures - According to Commander ApeTrully, The Vultures in this show are not friends or enemies of anyone and are considered neutral in the fight between Big Green and HighRoller's forces. 
 Cranes - The Zebra Brothers trick Crane King into attacking a human village and into believing that First Squad wanted to take his feathers to make dresses. 
 Flying Fish - The Flying Fish are under the command of Twin Masters. They can fly and bite. 
 Alpacas - A herd of Alpacas appeared when First Squad and Commander ApeTrully were climbing a mountain to get to Twin Masters. The Alpacas were struck by Twin Masters's chaotic lightning making them vicious and spiky. They were cured by Lin Chung's powers and First Squad's positive emotions. 
 Slugs - In this show, slugs are shown to be human-sized and they have tentacles on their faces, which they can shoot a sticky or slippery goo from. 
 Koalas - The Koala King is an old friend of Commander ApeTrully. It was revealed that Mighty Ray once took part in a wrestling tournament at Koala Castle and ended up defeated by a Koala. 
 Centipedes - Giant Centipedes have special earwax that can enable anyone who harvests them to assume the form of anyone. 
 Beetles - In this show, the Beetles are depicted to be large enough to carry humans. They can discharge the lightning that they absorb. 
 Wolf Eels - In this show, the Wolf Eels are a race of wolf-headed eels that live in the ruins where the Sword of Darkness is held. 
 Dragons - The Commander of Darkness managed to take control of the Dragons in his latest revenge plot on Big Green. 
 Mantis - In this show, the Mantis are shown to be the size of humans. Spotter the Rabbit enlisted the Mantis Army to help him take over Rabbit Castle. 
 Foxes - The Fox King is one of the few animals that wasn't fooled by HighRoller's lies. The Foxes can elongate their ears to be weapons.
 Spiders - In this show, the Spiders are larger than humans. They have spider soldiers called Arachno-Tanks that can shoot beams from their eyes and web balls from their mouths. 
 Lantern Fish - Lantern Fish King used the light on his lure to hypnotize Octopus King and Stingray King in a plot to create his own naval force while passing itself off as a ghost ship. 
 Sea Elephants - Under orders from Twin Masters, HighRoller sends the Sea Elephant Army (who actually resemble Walruses in this show) and the Hermit Crab Army to a secret island to secure Twin Masters's heart.
 Hermit Crabs - In this show, hermit crabs are shown to be slightly bigger than humans.
 Leeches - In this show, the Leeches are shown to be larger than humans. They can assume the form of anyone they acquire and have elasticity. They can also alter their size as one leech was shown to appear in the size of a real leech and then it grew.
 Pythons - A bunch of Pythons attacked Leech King in the form of the King of Lions only for them to be repelled by First Squad.
 Seahorses - The Seahorses can shoot water from their mouths and can act as water guns.
 Sloths - The Sloths wear coats that make them slow. But when the coats are removed, the sloths can move fast.
 Hyenas - Legend said that some humans stole treasures from the Animal Lords and hid them in their cave. The Animal Lords invoked a curse which turned the thieves' hideout into the Spirit Cave that turns anyone into their inner animal, with the thieves being turned into Hyenas.
 Oyster-Rahmas - Twin Masters enlisted the Oyster-Rahmas into helping him widen a trench that would be enough to drain Big Green's oceans.
 Gila Monsters - They are mentioned in "The Yeti & Phoenix" where they were enhanced by Twin Masters's magic when Lin Chung brings up First Squad's recent fight with HighRoller.
 Polar Bears - The Polar Bears are the arctic offshoot of the Bears.
 Roto-Wolves - The Roto-Wolves are a type of wolf that wears a helicopter pack. They can launch their claws in battle and throw the helicopter blades on their back as a boomerang when on the ground.
 Ants - Twin Masters enlarged some normal Ants into Giant Ants in a plot to unleash a lot of magma on Big Green.
 Komodo Dragons - The Komodo Dragons have lived since the days of when Twin Masters was a warrior. They can breathe fire and shoot the spikes that are on their bodies.
 Blowfish - In a plot to sink Big Green under the ocean, HighRoller enlists the Blowfish King and his army to assist him. The Blowfish can inflate themselves and shoot their spikes.
 Swamp Hippos - Twin Masters placed chaotic energy into the mouth of the Swamp Hippo King causing him and the other Swamp Hippos to attack the nearby village. The Swamp Hippos can launch out their teeth in battle (somewhat similar to staple guns).

Production and animation 
Toon City provided the animation for the show with their CelAction2D workstation engines.

Broadcast and release 
The show aired on Cartoon Network in the United States from 2010 to 2013 before later picking up on by their production company Splash Entertainment’s on-demand streaming service app, Kabillion Channel on YouTube, for re-runs after their run ended on Cartoon Network. The show has also aired on Teletoon in Canada.

In other media

Advertisements
Hero: 108 has appeared in many Beanfun! commercials to sponsor Gamania which featured many flash-animated clips of previous episodes, in which an event occurred which featured a big bean appearing being pixelated, then the character disappears which features the bean transforming into a question mark and an exclamation point. None of the characters have any dialog at all in the commercials except Mighty Ray in one commercial where he says "Okay, Banana?".

An American toy commercial was made to sponsor the Hero: 108 action figures that are available in Toys "R" Us. The commercial aired rarely, mostly on Cartoon Network, making it the only Hero: 108 commercial to air in television.

Video Game: Hero: 108 Online
An MMORPG based on the series had the players play as First Squad and Second Squad.
This MMORPG game was developed by Gamania's RedGate Games subsidiary. Its servers are now closed.

References

External links
 

2010s American animated television series
2010 American television series debuts
2012 American television series endings
2010s British animated television series
2010 British television series debuts
2012 British television series endings
2010s Canadian animated television series
2010 Canadian television series debuts
2012 Canadian television series endings
American children's animated action television series
American children's animated adventure television series
American children's animated drama television series
American children's animated science fantasy television series
American flash animated television series
British children's animated action television series
British children's animated adventure television series
British children's animated drama television series
British children's animated science fantasy television series
British flash animated television series
Canadian children's animated action television series
Canadian children's animated adventure television series
Canadian children's animated drama television series
Canadian children's animated science fantasy television series
Canadian flash animated television series
Chinese children's animated action television series
Chinese children's animated adventure television series
Chinese children's animated science fantasy television series
Anime-influenced Western animated television series
English-language television shows
Cartoon Network original programming
Television series by Splash Entertainment
Animated television series about rabbits and hares
Animated television series about mammals
Animated television series about monkeys
Animated television series about turtles
Works based on Water Margin